"Dreamer" is a hit single from British band Supertramp's 1974 album Crime of the Century. It peaked at number 13 on the UK Singles Chart in February 1975. In 1980, it appeared on the band's live album Paris. This live version was also released as a single and hit number 15 on the US charts, number 36 in the Dutch Top 40, and number one on the Canadian Singles Chart. When "Dreamer" had been released in 1974, its B-side "Bloody Well Right" was more popular in North America leading it to chart instead, at No. 35 in the US and No. 49 in Canada, with "Dreamer" only charting in Canada, that being at No. 75. "Dreamer" also appeared on Roger Hodgson's album, Classics Live, recorded on tour in 2010.

Background
"Dreamer" was composed by Roger Hodgson on his Wurlitzer piano at his mother's house when he was 19 years old. At that time he recorded a demo of the song using vocals, Wurlitzer, and banging cardboard boxes for percussion. Hodgson recalled, "I was excited – it was the first time I laid hands on a Wurlitzer." Supertramp cut their own recording of the song in imitation of this early demo.

The band performed the song on the BBC's Old Grey Whistle Test show in 1974, during which John Helliwell can be seen playing the rim of a wine glass on top of his keyboard to achieve a certain sound effect.

The song was used in the films The Parole Officer, Wild Thing, and The Adventures of Rocky and Bullwinkle, as well as the trailers for the latter and Robots.

Reception
Cash Box called it a "funny little song" and said that it "maintains the group's stance on instrumentation, lyrics and structure while offering a great deal of commercial potential."  Record World said that "The song is memorable, the style right for a mass audience." Record World later said that "the cute vocals and swirling, pulsating keyboards are contagious."  Ultimate Classic Rock critic Nick DeRiso rated it as Supertramp's 10th best song, calling it a "diaphanous slice of sentiment" in which it became apparent that Supertramp had found its own "art-pop sound."  Gary Graff of Billboard rated it as Supertramp's all-time greatest song, praising its twists and hooks. 

Reviewing the live version in 1980, Billboard said that "Dreamer" has a "sweet pop melody, clear vocals and bubbly keyboards."

Track listings

1974: 7-inch single
Side one
 "Dreamer" – 3:33 (Written by Roger Hodgson)
Side two
 "Bloody Well Right" – 4:26 (Written by Rick Davies)

1980: 7-inch single

US version
Side one
 "Dreamer" (Live) – 3:15 (Hodgson)
Side two
 "From Now On" (Live) – 6:44 (Davies)

European version
Side one
 "Dreamer" (Live) – 3:15 (Hodgson)
Side two
 "You Started Laughing" (Live) – 3:50 (Davies)

Personnel
Roger HodgsonWurlitzer electronic piano, lead vocal
Rick DaviesWurlitzer electronic piano, Hammond organ, lead vocal
John Helliwellceleste, glass harp, backing vocals
Bob Siebenbergdrums, percussion
Dougie Thomsonbass guitar

Charts

Studio version

Live version

References

External links

 "Dreamer" Lyrics - Roger Hodgson Official Website

Supertramp songs
Songs about dreams
1975 singles
1980 singles
RPM Top Singles number-one singles
Songs written by Rick Davies
Songs written by Roger Hodgson
Song recordings produced by Ken Scott
Live singles
1974 songs
A&M Records singles